Anuario Luis Herrera Solís (born 2 December 1959) is a Mexican politician affiliated with the Labor Party. As of 2014 he served as Deputy of the LX Legislature of the Mexican Congress representing Chiapas.

He is now the president of the Mexican Association of The Coffee Chain

References

1959 births
Living people
People from Chiapas
Labor Party (Mexico) politicians
21st-century Mexican politicians
Deputies of the LX Legislature of Mexico
Members of the Chamber of Deputies (Mexico) for Chiapas